Miconia villonacensis is a species of plant in the family Melastomataceae. It is endemic to Ecuador.

References

villonacensis
Endemic flora of Ecuador
Vulnerable flora of South America
Taxonomy articles created by Polbot